Keep On Truckin' may refer to:

 [[Keep On Truckin' (comics)|Keep On Truckin''' (comics)]], a comic and visual motif of underground comix by Robert Crumb

Television
 Keep On Truckin' (The Conners), the 2018 series premiere of the American sitcom The Conners [[Keep On Truckin' (TV series)|Keep On Truckin (TV series)]], a 1975 American comedy series

Music
 "Keep On Truckin (song), a 1973 song by Eddie Kendricks
 "Ja-Da" or "Keep On Truckin'", a 1918 song written by Bob Carleton
 Keep On Truckin''', an album by Dave Dudley, or its title song
 Keep On Truckin, an album by Larry Scott
 "Keep On Truckin'", a song by Pnau from Sambanova
 "Keep On Truckin'", a song by the Road Hammers from The Road Hammers
 "Keep On Truckin", a 1972 song by Hot Tuna from Burgers

See also 
 "Truckin'", a song by the Grateful Dead
 "Truckin' My Blues Away", a 1936 song by Blind Boy Fuller, to which the R. Crumb comic refers